James Gordon Gray  (1876 – 6 November 1934) was a Scottish mathematician and physicist.

Life

He was born in Glasgow in 1876, the third of eight children to Andrew Gray and his wife, Annie Gordon. He was educated at Friars Grammar School, in Bangor, Caernarvonshire, Wales, where his father was employed by the university. He attended the University College of North Wales until 1899, when his father and family moved back to Glasgow.

He studied engineering at Glasgow University and graduated BScEng. He then was employed by the university as a lecturer in physics from 1904. The university gave him a doctorate (DSc) in 1908. During the First World War he assisted with naval and aerial defence.

From 1920 to 1934 he was professor of applied physics at Glasgow University.

In 1909 he was elected a fellow of the Royal Society of Edinburgh. His proposers were his father, Andrew Gray, William Jack, Cargill Gilston Knott and George Chrystal.

He died in Dowanhill in Glasgow on 6 November 1934.

Publications

Dynamics (1911) co-written with his father

References

1876 births
1934 deaths
Scientists from Glasgow
People educated at Friars School, Bangor
Academics of the University of Glasgow
Alumni of the University of Glasgow
Scottish mathematicians
Scottish physicists
Fellows of the Royal Society of Edinburgh
Scottish electrical engineers
Mathematical physicists